Betra is a village in Pirojpur District in the Barisal Division of southwestern Bangladesh.

References

External links
Satellite map at Maplandia.com

Populated places in Pirojpur District